Citrin, also known as solute carrier family 25, member 13 (citrin) or SLC25A13, is a protein which in humans is encoded by the SLC25A13 gene.

Citrin is associated with type II citrullinemia and neonatal intrahepatic cholestasis caused by citrin deficiency (NICCD).

See also
 Solute carrier family

References

External links
 
 GeneReviews/NCBI/NIH/UW entry on Citrin Deficiency
 
 

Solute carrier family
EF-hand-containing proteins